Versigny is a commune in the Aisne department in Hauts-de-France in northern France. It is a member of the Communauté de communes des Villes d'Oyse. It is situated between Saint-Quentin, Laon and Chauny.

Population
In 2017, the municipality had 468 inhabitants.

See also
Communes of the Aisne department

References

Communes of Aisne
Aisne communes articles needing translation from French Wikipedia